Surya Varuna Claudine Bonaly (born 15 December 1973) is a French-born retired competitive figure skater. She is a three-time World silver medalist (1993–1995), a five-time European champion (1991–1995), the 1991 World Junior Champion, and a nine-time French national champion (1989–1997).

Bonaly is the only Olympic figure skater to land a backflip on one blade; she performed it at the 1998 Winter Olympics in Nagano, Japan.

Early life 
Surya Varuna Claudine Bonaly was born in Nice, France, on 15 December 1973. She was initially named Claudine and placed in an orphanage by her birth mother. She was adopted at eight months by Suzanne and Georges Bonaly, who named her Surya, meaning "the sun" in Sanskrit. Suzanne worked as a physical education teacher and Georges as an architect.

In the late 1980s, journalists claimed that Surya Bonaly was born in Réunion, an island off the coast of Madagascar, and was found lying on a coconut-strewn beach. However, the skater's passport documented her birth in Nice. Bonaly believes that the media couldn't accept that a young black adoptee could have been born in France.  Didier Gailhaguet, the first coach in her competitive skating career, later admitted fabricating this exotic backstory in order for her to gain more media attention and achieve better results in international competitions.  Gailhaguet also told reporters that she had been raised on a macrobiotic diet, ate birdseed for breakfast, and that the 17-inch ponytail she wore in her first Olympic appearance had never been cut. When Surya began researching her birth history, she discovered that her biological mother was from Réunion and her biological father from Ivory Coast.

Two years after adopting her, the Bonalys bought a rural property, renovating a decrepit sheepfold to use as a house. Surya grew up here, 50 kilometers from Nice. The house never had running water or electricity. Her parents also kept 26 goats. Surya took part in the daily farmwork. The parents nicknamed their house Sannyasa, a Sanskrit term that refers to a stage in a person's life. It is a period of spiritual development during which one renounces material possessions to concentrate purely on spiritual matters. Surya had flute lessons at eight in the morning and English lessons. She also practiced fencing, ballet, horse riding, and diving.   

Her mother was a physical education teacher and practiced many sports; she encouraged Surya to do the same. When Suzanne Bonaly took her students to the ice rink, she also took toddler Surya with her. At around two years of age, Surya began to skate on double blades, to keep busy while her mother was teaching. At age four, Surya developed a passion for gymnastics, training with Éric Hagard, who later coached Mélanie de Jesus dos Santos. Although she loved gymnastics as a teenager, Surya preferred figure skating and finally chose that.  Nicole Erdos, her first childhood coach in that sport, has suggested that Bonaly's gymnastics practice had strengthened her and given her an advantage on the ice over other competitors.

Skating career

In 1984, Surya Bonaly watched the Winter Olympic Games. Trying to perform a double Axel, she broke her ankle and had to wear a cast for nearly two months. When she returned to the ice rink, the French team trained by Didier Gailhaguet was taking every available space. Her mother asked Gailhaguet to give her daughter an hour on the ice, and the coach agreed. Bonaly tried again to do a double Axel with her newly healed ankle, which impressed Gailhaguet. He later said that "France had no hard fighters." 

He suggested to Bonaly's mother that her daughter come for his training sessions, each lasting three weeks. At the end of the course, Bonaly had progressed rapidly and almost reached the level of members of the French team. She had learned to land a double Axel and a triple jump. Seeing her athletic gifts, Gailhaguet recruited her parents to move with her to Paris so that she could train with him year-round.

The Bonaly family moved to Paris with their daughter. For six months, while training in Champigny-sur-Marne, she was home-schooled and lived in a van with her parents. Philippe Candeloro described her mother as pushing the girl to train hard and closely monitoring her social life and hobbies. 

A year later, Surya joined the French National Team. She was often a center of  media attention, encouraged in the spotlight by Gailhaguet. At age twelve, she learned to do a backflip on the ice. Gailhaguet said that he encouraged her to do on ice what she was already performing in gymnastics. She made her first backflip on ice and in public at a gala in Annecy in 1986. She also became a world junior tumbling champion that year. The same year, again in gymnastics, she was a world senior silver medalist in team at the 1986 World Championships with Sandrine Vacher, Corinne Robert and Isabelle Jagueux at the Palais omnisports of Paris-Bercy.

1987–1988 to 1989–1990 
During the 1987–1988 season, Surya Bonaly became the French junior figure-skating champion at Cherbourg. At the French Senior Championships in Grenoble, she placed fourth. She was sent as a junior to her first ISU Championship, the 1988 Junior Worlds in Brisbane, Australia. She finished 14th.

During the summer of 1988, Bonaly watched the Summer Olympics and was inspired by American sprinter Florence Griffith-Joyner, who dressed in a colorful running suit. She decided to adopt more original and colorful skating costumes, something unusual at the time.

Bonaly usually made eight to nine jumps during her programs, whereas conventional programs usually contain six. 

The following season, Bonaly won the bronze medal at 1989 World Junior Championships and her first senior national title. She began appearing regularly on the senior level, placing eighth at the 1989 European Championships and tenth at 1989 World Championships.

Bonaly was awarded the silver medal, behind Japan's Yuka Sato, at the 1990 World Junior Championships in Colorado Springs, Colorado. She finished fourth at the 1990 European Championships and ninth at the 1990 World Championships.

1990–1991 season: World Junior and European titles 
Bonaly began the season with a pair of senior international medals – gold at the 1990 Grand Prix International de Paris and bronze at the 1990 Skate Electric. Making her final junior appearance, she won the 1991 World Junior Championships in Budapest, Hungary. 

After taking her third national title, Bonaly competed at the 1991 European Championships in Sofia, Bulgaria. She was awarded the gold medal, placing ahead of two German skaters, Evelyn Großmann and Marina Kielmann. During the invasion of Kuwait, she designed a gala skating program that included a magic trick of a dove appearing, a symbol of peace.

Bonaly placed fifth at the 1991 World Championships in Munich, Germany. She nearly completed the first ratified quad by a female skater.

1991–1992 season: Second European title and first Olympic appearance 
In January 1992, Bonaly outscored Kielmann and Patricia Neske for the gold medal at the European Championships in Lausanne, Switzerland. In February 1992, she participated in the Winter Olympics in Albertville, France. During a practice session, she landed a back flip close to Japan's Midori Ito. Officials told her to avoid that action, as they believed that other skaters might be intimidated in practice sessions. Her costumes were custom made by French designer Christian Lacroix. 

Bonaly became the first woman to attempt a quadruple toe loop in competition but the jump was not fully rotated in the air and she had to complete the rotation on the ice. Due to the under rotation, the quad was downgraded under the ISU Judging System. Poised to win a medal after Ito and Harding had finished in 4th and 6th respectively in the short program, Kristi Yamaguchi and Nancy Kerrigan both made major errors in the free skate before her. Bonaly placed 6th in the free skate and 5th overall.

After the Olympics, Bonaly started working with a new coach, André Brunet, who coached her for one month. She concluded her season at the 1992 World Championships in Oakland, California. Ranked tenth in the short and 12th in the free, she finished 11th overall. She had made a number of jumping errors in both programs. She felt she was unfairly marked and later said that she had considered turning pro midway through the event.

1992–1993 season: First World silver medal 
From April to September 1992, Bonaly was coached mainly by her mother. She made two-month-long visits, in June and September, to coach Frank Carroll in southern California. Although she wanted to stay to work with him, the French skating federation was opposed to its skaters training abroad. Alain Giletti became her coach, commuting four times a week by train from Tours to Paris, and her mother filled in during his absences.

During the summer of 1992, Bonaly signed a contract to join Tom Collins' troop, Champions on Ice, two months a year. It enabled her to show her technical abilities without limitations, because she could perform somersaults and other actions that were prohibited in competition.

Bonaly won the 1993 European Championships in Helsinki, having placed first in both segments ahead of Ukraine's Oksana Baiul and Germany's Marina Kielmann. At the 1993 World Championships in Prague, she took silver behind Oksana Baiul, who had higher presentation scores. But Bonaly had significantly more technical content than the winner. Bonaly performed seven triples, a triple-triple combination, and two triple Lutzes, while Baiul performed five triples but did not attempt a jump combination.

1993–1994 season 
In January 1994, Bonaly placed first in all segments on her way to her fourth consecutive continental title at the Europeans Championships in Copenhagen, Denmark. The other medalists were Baiul and Russia's Olga Markova. A month later, Bonaly competed at the 1994 Winter Olympics in Lillehammer, Norway. Ranked third in the short program and fourth in the free skate, she finished fourth overall behind Baiul, American Nancy Kerrigan, and Chen Lu from China.

The media criticized Surya's mother, Suzanne Bonaly, for allegedly being too strict with her daughter. Surya ran every morning, was forbidden to eat sugar, and had to be in bed by nine.  Because Suzanne Bonaly was a physical education teacher, she stressed athletic prowess rather than the grace of a dancer in Surya’s skating routines. Suzanne Bonaly believes that she was criticized because of others' jealousy about Bonaly's abilities. Bonaly and her mother moved to Pralognan-la-Vanoise, where the skater could train out of the public eye.

At the 1994 World Championships in Chiba, Japan, Bonaly's final overall score was equal to that of home country favorite Yuka Sato. Sato was awarded the gold medal after a 5–4 tiebreaker decision.

Bonaly had expected the judges to reward her for improving her gracefulness, having stopped trying to land quadruple jumps, and having improved from previous championships, where she also finished second. Bonaly also cut her thickly braided ponytail because the judges didn't like it. She claims to have made concessions to please the judges but did not believe she was sufficiently recognized or rewarded for them. Bonaly told the French podcast Surya Bonaly, corps et lames: "I did everything I could, but I didn't paint myself white, that's for sure." 

Upset by the result in Chiba, Bonaly stood beside the medals platform rather than on it. She eventually was coaxed onto the platform but took off her silver medal after it was presented to her; the crowd booed her for this action. After the medals presentation, Bonaly's only statement to reporters was: "I'm just not lucky."

The international judge Anne Hardy-Thomas, from France, who did not participate in this competition, commented on the judges' decision. She said that the judges are under great pressure, as their names are displayed opposite their notes. She said she had sometimes placed a French skater lower in order to avoid being accused of favoritism. American judges were thought to value a graceful skater who meets the beauty standards, such as Nancy Kerrigan, while European judges, particularly of the Eastern bloc, favored skaters who were strong athletes and creative in their programs, such as Bonaly.

The international federation first thought of punishing Bonaly for her actions, but decided to let it go, understanding that she was severely disappointed by the results.

1994–1995 season: Fifth European title 
In 1995, Bonaly won the European Championships for the fifth time, overtaking short-program winner Markova. At the 1995 World Championships in Birmingham, England, she placed fourth in the short program but rose to second after the free skate. She was awarded her third World silver medal, behind Chen Lu of China. For the third consecutive year, she lost the gold medal by one-tenth of a point, the score of one judge. Her free skate had the most difficult technical content, with two triple Lutzes, two triple-triple combos, and seven triples.

1995–1996 season 
In autumn 1995, Bonaly competed in the inaugural ISU Champions Series. She finished third and fourth at her assignments, which was not enough to qualify to the seven-woman final. Ranked first in the short program and second in the free skate, Bonaly took silver behind Russia's Irina Slutskaya at the 1996 European Championships in Sofia, Bulgaria. She finished fifth at the 1996 World Championships in Edmonton, Alberta, Canada. She had placed seventh in the short, where she fell on a triple Lutz, and fifth in the free.

1996–1997 season 
In May 1996, Bonaly ruptured her achilles tendon while doing acrobatics. Due to the injury, she missed much of the following season. The French federation initially decided not to name her to the 1997 European Championships in Paris, believing that she lacked fitness, but Bonaly successfully appealed. She finished 9th overall after placing 6th in qualifying group B, 6th in the short program, and 10th in the free skate. She was not included in France's two-women team to the World Championships, passed over in favor of Vanessa Gusmeroli, the top French finisher at Europeans, and Laetitia Hubert, who placed behind Bonaly at the same event.

1997–1998 season: Third Olympics 
During the season, Bonaly was coached by her mother Suzanne Bonaly and Tatiana Tarasova in Marlborough, Massachusetts, United States. Prior to the 1998 Winter Olympics in Nagano, Japan, Bonaly ruptured her achilles tendon. She placed 6th in the short program. Unable to complete her planned routine or a successful triple Lutz due to injury, she decided to perform a backflip with a split landing on one blade during the free skate. (This move is now dubbed a "Bonaly"). Backflips had been banned since 1976 from competitions held under ISU rules. Having landed on one foot, Bonaly hoped to avoid a deduction but did have points deducted. She was still pleased to have performed it. Bonaly is the first and only Olympic figure skater to land a backflip on one blade. 

She turned her back to the judges when she completed her program. Anne Hardy-Thomas, the French judge of the event, was approached by the technical delegate, who told her that Bonaly was insolent and had behaved unacceptably. The judge replied, "She did well for all the past years". Bonaly finished tenth in Nagano and retired from amateur competition after the event.

Her skating clubs were CSG Pralognan and CSG Champigny.

Technical statistics

Jump combinations 
Bonaly was known for her way of performing jumps and making very difficult new combinations :
 1989 European Championships in Birmingham and 1989 World championships in Paris: 1st female figure skater to attempt the Lutz  - triple toe loop combination.
 1991 Skate America in  Oakland: 1st female figure skater to attempt the flip - triple toe loop combination.
 1991 Skate Canada in  London: 1st female figure skater to attempt the triple - triple - double (triple toe loop - triple toe loop - double toe loop) combination.
 1992 NHK Trophy in Tokyo: 1st female figure skater to attempt the Salchow - triple toe loop combination.
 1993 World Championships in Prague: 1st female figure skater to attempt the toe loop - half loop - triple Salchow  combination.
 1993 Piruetten in Hamar: 1st female figure skater to attempt two triple - triple combinations in a free skate. She attempted the combination again at the 1994 Olympic Games and at the World Championships in 1994 and in 1995 by performing in the same free skate the flip - triple toe loop combination and the toe loop - half loop - triple Salchow jump sequence.
 1998 Olympic Games in Nagano: 1st female figure skater to attempt a triple - triple combination at the Olympic Games in the short program (triple toe loop - triple toe loop).

Quadruple jumps 
 Bonaly was the first female figure skater to attempt a quadruple jump in competition at the 1990 European Championships.
 She tried at least thirteen times to do the quadruple toe loop or / and the quadruple Salchow in competition: two attempts at quad jumps at the 1990 European Championships (salchow and toe loop), a quad toe loop attempt at the 1990 World Championships, a quad toe loop attempt at the 1990 Goodwill Games, a quad Salchow attempt at the 1990 Trophée Lalique, a quad toe loop attempt at the World Championships in 1991, a quad toe loop attempt at the 1991 NHK Trophy, a quad toe loop attempt at the 1991 French Championships, a quad toe loop attempt at the 1992 Olympic Games, a quad toe loop attempt at the 1992 World Championships, a quad Salchow attempt at the 1993 Skate America, a quad Salchow attempt at the 1993 Piruetten and a quad Salchow attempt at the 1996 World Championships.
 She landed four times the quad toe loop in competition: at the 1991 World Championships, at the 1991 NHK Trophy, at the 1992 Olympic Games, and at the 1992 World Championships, but always with incomplete rotation that cost her points.
 At the 1990 European Championships in Leningrad, she was the first figure skater to attempt two different quads in the same free skate (Salchow and toe loop).

Backflip 
Bonaly performed her first backflip at an exhibition at the age of twelve in Annecy. Bonaly is also the first and only Olympic figure skater to land a backflip on one blade. On several occasions she has completed a backflip landing on two blades, followed by a triple toe loop, a backflip landing on one blade, followed by a triple Salchow, and two backflips in a row. The backflip remains prohibited in competition. Bonaly performed it at her last amateur competition at the 1998 Olympic Games. After turning professional, at age 40, she performed her last backflip in public at an exhibition in São Paulo, Brazil.

Later professional career 
Bonaly toured with the Champions on Ice skating show for several years; it went out of business after 2007. She also performed in shows in Russia with Evgeni Plushenko and was a guest skater at Ice Theatre of New York's December 2008 gala in NYC. She successfully performed her backflip there.

Bonaly was an off-screen character on the "Will on Ice" episode of NBC's Will & Grace, which originally aired on 12 January 1999. In 2010, she was a finalist on La Ferme Célébrités season 3. 

She appeared in the Netflix documentary series Losers, which explores the lives of individuals who bounced back from loss or perceived failure. Bonaly's episode, entitled "Judgement", focused on her defiance, "longevity" on the ice, and refusal to submit to conventions. In 2015, she underwent surgery after the discovery of numerous cysts along her spinal cord. This ended her performing career.

Bonaly is coaching in Las Vegas while regularly doing seminars abroad.

Racism in figure skating 
In an interview with the BBC, when asked if she ever felt that things were harder for her as one of the first black figure skaters, Bonaly said: 
"It was a mix of so many things. First, because I was black for sure and I didn't try to copy anyone. Second, because I came from a small country. Third, because I've had a different hairstyle and look and also because my mother made my skating costumes for so many years. All those things together was just too much for some people to handle."

In an interview with The Root, Bonaly said: "...Race matters for sure, because I know that if I'd been white, I would have had more [endorsement] contracts and been bigger."

Bonaly elaborated on the matter when interviewed by Mathieu Méranville for his book Sport, malédiction des Noirs? (2007) :

Activism 
Bonaly takes part in numerous conferences and events directed to encourage the participation in sport of people of colour.

She also became active in animal issues, participating in numerous PETA's campaigns against Canada's seal hunt and the fur trade.

Bonaly is also against bullfighting. She asked to meet with president of France, Nicolas Sarkozy, who received her at the Élysée Palace on 26 September 2007, to address the abolition of bullfighting and to prohibit attendance at bullfighting by children under age 16.

Bonaly was a member of the federal council of the French Federation of Ice Sports from 2010 to 2014. She served as the cultural attaché for the Monaco consulate in Las Vegas.

She was the ambassador of the association "France of talents and colors", which aims to fight against racism, violence, and discrimination in sport.

Personal life 
Bonaly became an American citizen in January 2004. She lives in Las Vegas, Nevada. Bonaly became engaged to skating coach Peter Biver on 18 September 2016. She has no children.

Bonaly was raised as a vegetarian by her parents and has maintained that practice.

Awards and honors 
 Commander of the Legion of Honour: Knight (2019)''.

Programs

Competitive highlights

References

External links

 
 

1973 births
Living people
French female single skaters
European Figure Skating Championships medalists
Figure skaters at the 1992 Winter Olympics
Figure skaters at the 1994 Winter Olympics
Figure skaters at the 1998 Winter Olympics
French emigrants to the United States
French people of Réunionnais descent
La Ferme Célébrités participants
Olympic figure skaters of France
Sportspeople from Nice
World Figure Skating Championships medalists
World Junior Figure Skating Championships medalists
Goodwill Games medalists in figure skating
Medalists at the Trampoline Gymnastics World Championships
Oath takers at the Olympic Games
Competitors at the 1990 Goodwill Games
Competitors at the 1994 Goodwill Games
Black French sportspeople